is a professional Japanese baseball player. He plays pitcher for the Orix Buffaloes.

References 

1997 births
Living people
Baseball people from Wakayama Prefecture
Japanese baseball players
Nippon Professional Baseball pitchers
Orix Buffaloes players
People from Gobō, Wakayama
Asian Games silver medalists for Japan
Asian Games medalists in baseball
Baseball players at the 2018 Asian Games
Medalists at the 2018 Asian Games